North Korea competed as the Democratic People's Republic of Korea at the 2004 Summer Olympics in Athens, Greece, from 13 to 29 August 2004. This was the nation's seventh appearance at the Olympics since its debut in 1972. North Korean athletes did not attend the 1984 Summer Olympics in Los Angeles, when they joined the Soviet boycott, and subsequently, led a boycott at the 1988 Summer Olympics in Seoul, along with six other nations.

Olympic Committee of the Democratic People's Republic of Korea sent a total of 36 athletes, 13 men and 23 women, to compete only in 9 sports. For the second time in Olympic history, North Korea was represented by more female than male athletes due to its stark team size of women in diving and artistic gymnastics. Former basketball player and National Olympic Committee official Kim Song-Ho became the nation's flag bearer in the opening ceremony. Both North Korea and South Korea marched together in the Parade of Nations at the Opening and Closing Ceremonies under the Korean Unification Flag, a white flag showing the united Korean peninsula in blue. They had two flagbearers carrying the flag together at each occasion, one representing the North and the other representing the South. The female athletes and staff wore red blazers, while their male counterparts wore blue. Although they marched together, the teams competed separately and had separate medal tallies.

North Korea left Athens with a total of five Olympic medals (four silver and one bronze), failing to claim a single gold for the second consecutive time since Sydney. All of these medals were awarded to the athletes in boxing, judo, shooting, table tennis, and weightlifting. Lightweight judoka Kye Sun-Hui managed to complete a full set of medals in her illustrious sporting career with a silver, in addition to her gold in Atlanta and bronze in Sydney.

Medalists

Athletics 

North Korean athletes have so far achieved qualifying standards in the following athletics events (up to a maximum of 3 athletes in each event at the 'A' Standard, and 1 at the 'B' Standard).

Key
 Note–Ranks given for track events are within the athlete's heat only
 Q = Qualified for the next round
 q = Qualified for the next round as a fastest loser or, in field events, by position without achieving the qualifying target
 NR = National record
 N/A = Round not applicable for the event
 Bye = Athlete not required to compete in round

Men

Women

Boxing 

Kim Song-Guk was a surprise finalist in the featherweight class, beating the European bronze medalist in the second round and the All-Africa Games silver medalist in the quarters before edging World runner-up and European champion Vitali Tajbert in the semifinals. In the final, Tichtchenko pulled out into an early lead over Kim and never looked back, easily taking victory and leaving Kim to the silver medal.

Diving 

North Korean divers qualified for four individual spots in the following events.

Men

Women

Gymnastics

Artistic
Men

Women
Team

Individual finals

Judo

Six North Korean judoka (one man and five women) qualified for the following events.

Men

Women

Shooting 

Three North Korean shooters (two men and one woman) qualified to compete in the following events:

Men

Women

Table tennis

Four North Korean table tennis players qualified for the following events.

Weightlifting 

Four North Korean weightlifters qualified for the following events:

Wrestling

Key
  - Victory by Fall.
  - Decision by Points - the loser with technical points.
  - Decision by Points - the loser without technical points.

Men's freestyle

See also
 North Korea at the 2002 Asian Games

References

External links
Official Report of the XXVIII Olympiad

Korea, North
2004
Summer Olympics